Rekha Palli (born 9 March 1963) is a sitting judge of the Delhi High Court in India. She has been the judge in a number of politically significant cases, including those relating to the disqualification of Aam Aadmi Party MLAs, the qualifications for enrolment in the Central Industrial Security Force, and the disappearance of Delhi University student Najeeb Ahmad. As a counsel, Palli also represented Indian Air Force officers in a significant case that resulted in ending of a discriminatory practice that denied the grant of permanent commissions to female officers.

Life 
Palli was educated at the Lady Irwin School in New Delhi, and studied science at Hindu College before obtaining a degree in law in 1986, from the Faculty of Law at Delhi University.

Career

Litigation 
Palli practiced law in Delhi, as well as at the Punjab and Haryana High Court, and the Supreme Court of India, after enrolling at the bar in 1986. In 2015, she was designated as a senior counsel by the Delhi High Court.

In 2010, Palli represented nine women officers of the Indian Air Force, in a case by which they challenged the force's practice of denying permanent commissions to women officers. The case was filed after a Supreme Court order directed the Indian Army to grant permanent commissions to women officers in the same manner that such commissions were granted to male officers. The Delhi High Court ruled in favor of granting permanent commissions to qualified women officers, following which the Indian Air Force commenced granting short service commissions to them.

Judicial career 
Palli was appointed a judge to the Delhi High Court on 15 May 2017.

In 2017, Palli ordered a case concerning the disappearance and suspected murder of Delhi University student Najeeb Ahmad, after an alleged altercation with members of the Akhil Bharatiya Vidyarthi Parishad, to be transferred to the Central Bureau of Investigation. The case gained significant public attention following protests from Delhi University students about the lack of results while the case was being investigated by the Delhi Police.

In 2018, Palli heard a politically significant case concerning the disqualification of twenty-three members of the Delhi Legislative Assembly, belonging to the Aam Aadmi Party. The case gained a great deal of public attention, before Palli allowed it to be withdrawn with the consent of the parties involved. In 2018, Palli and another judge, Hima Kohli, held that it was legal for the Union Government to terminate the employment of members of the Central Industrial Security Force who tested as color-blind.

References 

1963 births
Living people
Judges of the Delhi High Court
20th-century Indian lawyers
20th-century Indian women lawyers
21st-century Indian judges
21st-century Indian women judges